Sativa, sativus, and sativum are Latin botanical adjectives meaning cultivated. It is often associated botanically with plants that promote good health and used to designate certain seed-grown domestic crops.

Usage
Sativa (ending in -a) is the feminine form of the adjective, but masculine (-us) and neuter (-um) endings are also used to agree with the gender of the nouns they modify. For example, the masculine Crocus sativus and neuter Pisum sativum.

Examples
Examples of crops incorporating this word and its variations into their Latin name include:

 Allium sativum, garlic.
 Avena sativa, the common oat.
 Cannabis sativa, one of three forms of cannabis.
 Castanea sativa, sweet chestnut.
 Crocus sativus, the saffron crocus.
 Cucumis sativus, the cucumber.
 Daucus carota subsp. sativus, the carrot, a plant species.
 Eruca sativa, the rocket or arugula, a leaf vegetable. 
Lactuca sativa, Lollo rosso lettuce.
 Medicago sativa, alfalfa.
 Nigella sativa, a flower whose edible seeds are sometimes known as "black cumin" or "black caraway".
 Oryza sativa, rice.Pastinaca sativa., parsnip, a root vegetable closely related to the carrot and parsley; all belong to the family Apiaceae.
 Pisum sativum'', pea plant.

See also
 8 Foot Sativa, a New Zealand–based metal band
 Sativa (Jhené Aiko song)
 Sativanorte and Sativasur, towns/municipalities in the Colombian department of Boyacá
 Sativum (disambiguation)
 Sativus (disambiguation)

References

Latin biological phrases
Horticulture